Below is the list of the 286 Major League Baseball players who have reached the 2,000 hit milestone during their career in MLB. Pete Rose holds the Major League record for most career hits, with 4,256. Rose and Ty Cobb, second most, are the only players with 4,000 or more career hits. George Davis was the first switch hitter to collect 2,000 hits, achieving that total during the 1902 season.

Players with 2,000 or more hits

Stats updated as of through the 2022 season.

Active players with 1,800 or more hits through 2022.

Elvis Andrus (1,997) 133 in 2022
Andrew McCutchen (1,948) 122 in 2022
José Altuve (1,935) 158 in 2022
Freddie Freeman (1,903) 199 in 2022
Evan Longoria (1,883) 65 in 2022

See also
List of Nippon Professional Baseball career hits leaders
List of KBO career hits leaders

Notes

References
Specific

External links
Baseball Reference
MLB official list
Retrosheet - Ty Cobb

Hits
Major League Baseball statistics